Raffaela Wolf (born 20 June 1978) is a German female ice hockey player. She played forward position.

Playing career

Germany
Wolf was born in Dinslaken, West Germany.

She competed at two IIHF Women's World Championships. Her team finished 5th (Pool A) in 2001 and 7th (Pool A) in 2000.
She represented Germany in the Germany women's national ice hockey team at the Winter Olympic Games. She competed in the 2002 Olympics and at the 2006 Olympics.

Career stats

IIHF Worlds

Olympics

NCAA

Awards and honors
2002-03 Hockey East All-Academic Team

References

See also
 Germany women's national ice hockey team

1978 births
German women's ice hockey forwards
Ice hockey players at the 2002 Winter Olympics
Ice hockey players at the 2006 Winter Olympics
Living people
Maine Black Bears women's ice hockey players
Olympic ice hockey players of Germany
German expatriate ice hockey people
German expatriate sportspeople in the United States
People from Wesel (district)
Sportspeople from Düsseldorf (region)